Ramus of the ischium may refer to:
 Superior ramus of the ischium
 Inferior ramus of the ischium